Damian was a senior Byzantine eunuch official during the reign of Emperor Michael III (842–867), serving as the head chamberlain (parakoimomenos) to the emperor.

Biography
Theophanes Continuatus reports that Damian was a eunuch and of Slavic origin. He held the influential post of head chamberlain (parakoimomenos), with the rank of patrikios, under Michael III, and perhaps, according to the later Patria of Constantinople, already under Michael's father Theophilos as well. The Byzantinist Henri Grégoire suggested that Damian might be identifiable with the Byzantine admiral, known only from Arabic sources as " Ibn Qatuna", who led the Sack of Damietta in 853, by interpreting the Arabic name as a corruption of the title epi tou koitonos ("in charge of the imperial bedchamber").

He belonged to the circle of high officials who opposed Theoktistos, the powerful minister who monopolized power during the first half of Michael's reign. He was instrumental in securing the recall of Michael's uncle Bardas from exile, culminating in the death of Theoktistos and the assumption of control over state affairs by Bardas in 855. In 865, however, he fell out with Bardas, who began scheming against him, and persuaded Michael to dismiss him and have him tonsured. His successor became Basil the Macedonian, the future founder of the Macedonian dynasty.

Damian himself retired to the church of the palace of the quarter of St. Mamas. According to the Patria, he also built the monastery known as tou Damianou ("Damian's").

References

Sources
 
 

9th-century Byzantine people
9th-century Byzantine monks
Byzantine eunuchs
Byzantine people of Slavic descent
Parakoimomenoi